Count Friedrich Carl Eugen Vsemir von Berchtold, baron von Ungarschitz (25 October 1781 – 3 April 1876), was a German-speaking Bohemian physician and botanist from Austrian descent.

Biography
Berchtold was born in Stráž nad Nežárkou (now District Jindřichův Hradec), in the Austrian Empire.
He graduated from medical school in 1804, after which he practiced medicine and devoted much of his time to botany and natural history. He eventually abandoned regular medical practice and travelled throughout Europe, the Middle East and Brazil. He co-authored several research papers with brother botanists Carl Borivoj Presl and Jan Svatopluk Presl, including an important taxonomic work, O Přirozenosti Rostlin.

An avid worker for Czech national revival, Berchtold was involved in the establishment of the Prague National Museum. He died in 1876 in Buchlau (now Buchlovice), Moravia (now part of the Czech Republic).

The genus Berchtoldia C.Presl (syn. Chaetium Nees) was named in his honor.

Selected publications

See also
 :Category:Taxa named by Friedrich von Berchtold

Notes
 Hrabě is the Czech equivalent, the female form is hraběnka.

References

External links
 Partial list of papers by Berchtold - WorldCat 
 Berchtold biography  on Czech Radio

Bibliography 

 
 

19th-century Austrian botanists
Czech botanists
1781 births
1876 deaths
Bryologists
Pteridologists
Botanists with author abbreviations
Friedrich
Bohemian nobility
Counts of Austria
German Bohemian people
Austrian people of German Bohemian descent
People from Stráž nad Nežárkou
19th-century Czech singers